Hilvarenbeek is a municipality and a town in the south of the Netherlands, along the border with Belgium.

The biggest tourist attraction is called Beekse Bergen, consisting of a safari park, amusement park/playground, holiday bungalow park, and camping parks. 

In the centre of the town the Sint-Petrus'-Banden is a Gothic church from the 14th and 15th centuries. The tower is a highlight of the Kempen Gothic.

Population centres 
The municipality of Hilvarenbeek also includes the following villages with their own churches:

In addition, the following parts were historically separate, but are nowadays more like neighbourhoods:

Topography

Dutch Topographic map of the municipality of Hilvarenbeek, June 2015.

Notable people 

 Johannes Goropius Becanus (1519 in Gorp – 1573) a Dutch physician, linguist, and humanist
 Martinus Becanus (1563 in Hilvarenbeek – 1624) a Jesuit priest, theologian and controversialist 
 Jacques Thomassen (born 1945 in Diessen) a Dutch organizational theorist and academic
 Henny Vrienten (born 1948 in Hilvarenbeek – 2022) a Dutch composer of TV and film scores 
 Annie Abrahams (born 1954 in Hilvarenbeek) a Dutch performance artist in video installations and the internet
 Henk Baars (born 1960 in Diessen) a former professional Dutch cyclo-cross cyclist
 Ronald van Raak (born 1969 in Hilvarenbeek) a Dutch politician, non-fiction writer and former academic

Gallery

References

External links

Official website

 
Municipalities of North Brabant
Populated places in North Brabant